Slaves Shall Serve is the fifth EP by Polish extreme metal band Behemoth. The first four tracks were recorded during the Demigod studio sessions at Hendrix Studios during July and August in 2004. The last two tracks were recorded live at the Sweden Rock Festival in 2005.

The EP was released as an enhanced audio disc with two videos of Slaves Shall Serve. Both the censored and uncensored versions are included.

In 2011, the EP (along with several previously unreleased live tracks) was bundled with Conjuration and released as part of the compilation album Abyssus Abyssum Invocat.

Track listing

Personnel

Release history

References 

Behemoth (band) EPs
2005 EPs
Regain Records EPs
Albums produced by Adam Darski